Huntly North is a rural locality in the City of Greater Bendigo, in the state of Victoria.

References 

Bendigo
Towns in Victoria (Australia)
Suburbs of Bendigo